M. Şükrü Hanioğlu is a Turkish professor of late Ottoman history in the Department of Near Eastern Studies at Princeton University. Between 2005 and 2014, he was the department chair.

Education
He received his B.A. in political science and economics and his Ph.D. in political science from Istanbul University. His thesis was on the political activities and thought of one of the founders of the Committee of Union and Progress (CUP), Dr. Abdullah Cevdet.

Research
He has done extensive research on the history of the CUP during the period from 1889 to 1908, i.e. from its foundation to the Young Turk Revolution using organization's own papers (since it was an underground organization), archival sources including those found in the Turkish, German, Austrian, French, Swiss, Italian, Greek, and British archives. He was also the first foreign scholar to visit the national archives of Albania, during the period when hardly anyone could visit the country.

Representative publications

 Bir siyasal düşünür olarak Doktor Abdullah Cevdet ve Dönemi, Istanbul, 1981
 Bir siyasal örgüt olarak Osmanlı Ittihad ve Terakki Cemiyeti ve Jon Türklük, Istanbul, 1986
 Young Turks in Opposition, Oxford University Press, 1995
 Preparation for a Revolution: The Young Turks, 1902–1908, Oxford University Press, 2001
 Brief History of the Late Ottoman Empire, Princeton, 2008
 "Transformation of the Ottoman intelligentsia and the idea of science," Anuarul Institutului de Istorie si Arheologie A.D., Xenopol, 1987
 "Notes on the Young Turks and the Freemasons," Middle Eastern Studies, 25 (1989)
 "Der Jungtürkenkongress von Paris (1902) und seine Ergebnisse," Die Welt des Islams 33 (1993)
 "Transformation of the Ottoman intelligentsia and the idea of science," Anuarul Institutului de Istorie si Arheologie A.D., Xenopol, 1987

References

External links
 His biography at Princeton University

Turkish academics
Princeton University faculty
Year of birth missing (living people)
Living people
Historians of Turkey
Members of the Turkish Academy of Sciences
Istanbul University alumni